Poa howellii is a species of grass known by the common name Howell's bluegrass.

It is native to western North America from British Columbia to throughout California. It grows in rocky areas in woodlands and chaparral, as well as disturbed areas.

Description
Poa howellii is an annual bunchgrass growing in dense, narrow tufts up to 80 centimeters tall.

The inflorescence is a series of whorls of branches bearing spikelets, the branches growing appressed to the stem and then spreading out from the stem as the spikelets mature.

External links
Jepson Manual Treatment
USDA Plants Profile
Grass Manual Treatment
Photo gallery

howellii
Native grasses of California
Grasses of Canada
Grasses of the United States
Flora of British Columbia
Flora of the West Coast of the United States
Flora of the Cascade Range
Flora of the Klamath Mountains
Flora of the Sierra Nevada (United States)
Natural history of the California chaparral and woodlands
Natural history of the California Coast Ranges
Natural history of the Central Valley (California)
Natural history of the Peninsular Ranges
Natural history of the San Francisco Bay Area
Natural history of the Santa Monica Mountains
Natural history of the Transverse Ranges
Flora without expected TNC conservation status